The 2003 Tennis Masters Cup was a men's tennis tournament played on outdoor hard courts. It was the 34th edition of the year-end singles championships and the 29th edition of the year-end doubles championships, and was part of the 2003 ATP Tour. It took place at the Westside Tennis Club in Houston, Texas in the United States from November 8 through November 16, 2003.

Finals

Singles

 Roger Federer defeated  Andre Agassi 6–3, 6–0, 6–4
 It was Federer's 9th title of the year and the 17th of his career. It was his 1st career year-end championships title.

Doubles

 Bob Bryan /  Mike Bryan defeated  Michaël Llodra /  Fabrice Santoro 6–7(6–8), 6–3, 3–6, 7–6(7–3), 6–4 
 It was Bob Bryan's 5th title of the year and the 14th of his career. It was Mike Bryan's 5th title of the year and the 16th of his career.

Points breakdown

Singles

Doubles

References

External links
 Official website

 
Tennis Masters Cup
ATP Finals
Tennis tournaments in the United States
Tennis Masters Cup
Tennis Masters Cup
2003 in American tennis
Tennis Masters
2003 in Houston
November 2003 sports events in the United States